Anglican prayer beads, also known as the Anglican rosary or Anglican chaplet, are a loop of strung Christian prayer beads used chiefly by Anglicans in the Anglican Communion, as well as by communicants in the Anglican Continuum. This Anglican devotion has spread to other Christian denominations, including Methodists and the Reformed.

Description

Anglican prayer bead sets consist of a cross and thirty-three beads.

Beads
Thirty-two of the beads are divided into four groups consisting of seven beads each which are called "weeks". Four additional separate and larger beads separating the four groups are called "cruciform" beads. When the loop of an Anglican prayer bead set is opened into a circular shape, the "cruciform" beads form the points of a cross within the circle of the set, hence the term. Next after the cross on Anglican prayer bead sets is a single bead called the "invitatory" bead, which brings the total of beads to thirty-three.

Materials
The beads used can be made of a variety of materials, such as precious stones, wood, coloured glass, or even dried and painted seeds.

Symbolism
The number thirty-three signifies the number of years that Jesus Christ lived on the Earth, while the number seven signifies wholeness or completion in the faith, the days of creation, and the seasons of the Church year.

Cross
Anglican prayer bead sets are made with a variety of crosses or, occasionally, crucifixes. Christian crosses such as the Celtic cross and the San Damiano cross are two which are often used, though other styles are used too.

Prayer

Anglican prayer beads are most often used as a tactile aid to prayer and as a counting device. The standard Anglican set consists of the following pattern, starting with the cross, followed by the Invitatory Bead, and subsequently, the first Cruciform bead, moving to the right, through the first set of seven beads to the next Cruciform bead, continuing around the circle. He or she may conclude by saying the Lord's Prayer on the invitatory bead or a final prayer on the cross as in the examples below. The entire circle may be done thrice, which signifies the Holy Trinity.

See also 

Quiet Time

Notes

Bibliography

Further reading

External links

Christian Prayer Beads Central
Anglican Prayer Beads
History of Prayer Beads

Christian prayer
Prayer beads
Rosary
Anglican Mariology
Anglican liturgy
Anglo-Catholicism
Personal ordinariates